"The Continuing Story of Bungalow Bill" is a song written by John Lennon (credited to Lennon–McCartney), and released by the English rock band the Beatles on their 1968 double album The Beatles (also known as the "White Album"). The song was recorded at EMI Studios on 8 October 1968 and was completed (including all overdubs) the same day. The group also started and completed the Lennon-composed "I'm So Tired" during the same recording session. Along with Lennon, the song also contains co-lead vocals by Yoko Ono, the only song recorded by the group to feature lead vocals by a non-member.

Composition

This song mocks the actions of a young American named Richard A. Cooke III, known as Rik, who was visiting his mother, Nancy Cooke de Herrera, at the ashram of Maharishi Mahesh Yogi in Rishikesh at the same time that the Beatles were staying with the Maharishi. According to his mother, both she and her son maintained friendly relations with all of the Beatles except for Lennon, who by Cooke de Herrera's account was "a genius" but distant and contemptuous of the wealthy American Cooke de Herrera and her clean-cut, college-attending son. According to Nancy's life account, Beyond Gurus, the genesis of the song occurred when she, Rik, and several others, including guides, set out upon elephants to hunt for a tiger (allegedly presented by their Indian guide as a traditional act). The pack of elephants was attacked by a tiger, which was shot by Rik. Rik was initially proud of his quick reaction and posed for a photograph with his prize. However, Rik's reaction to the slaying was mixed, as he has not hunted since. Nancy claims that all present recognised the necessity of Rik's action, but that Lennon's reaction was scornful and sarcastic, asking Rik: "But wouldn't you call that slightly life-destructive?" The song was written by Lennon as mocking what he saw as Rik's bravado and unenlightened attitude.

Lennon later told his version of the story in a Playboy interview, stating that: "'Bungalow Bill' was written about a guy in Maharishi's meditation camp who took a short break to go shoot a few poor tigers, and then came back to commune with God. There used to be a character called Jungle Jim, and I combined him with Buffalo Bill. It's sort of a teenage social-comment song and a bit of a joke." Mia Farrow, who was also at the ashram during the period, supports Lennon's story in her autobiography; she writes, "Then a self-important, middle-aged American woman arrived, moving a mountain of luggage into the brand-new private bungalow next to Maharishi's along with her son, a bland young man named Bill. People fled this newcomer, and no one was sorry when she left the ashram after a short time to go tiger hunting, unaware that their presence had inspired a new Beatles song – 'Bungalow Bill.'"

Musical structure
The song opens with a flamenco guitar phrase, played from a standard Mellotron bank of pre-recorded rhythms and phrases by studio engineer Chris Thomas. It is unknown how the sample was chosen. The solo involves all seven notes of the Phrygian mode, including a Spanish-sounding II, a natural seventh from the harmonic minor scale and a blues-sounding 5. On some CD reissues, this solo closes the previous track, "Wild Honey Pie". The opening guitar solo is followed by the chorus in the key of C major, shifting between V (G on "Bungalow") and iv (Fm on "what did you"). What follows is a relative minor bridge starting with Am (on "He went out") then shifting to VI (F on "elephant") and VII (G on "gun"). Lennon then uses a V (E on "all-American") VII (G on "bullet-headed") i (Am on "Saxon-mother's") and VI (Fm on "son") to get back to the C major key. It is sung by all four Beatles, Ringo's then-wife Maureen, and Yoko Ono. The Mellotron reappears during the verses, played by Lennon, using mandolin samples, and during the outro, played by Thomas, using trombone samples. Lennon, who wrote the song, is the primary lead singer. Like the majority of Beatles songs written by either Lennon or Paul McCartney, it is credited to Lennon–McCartney.

Legacy

In Revolution in the Head, Ian MacDonald describes "The Continuing Story of Bungalow Bill" as a "lapse into tub-thumping banality."

Coinciding with the 50th anniversary of its release, Jacob Stolworthy of The Independent listed "The Continuing Story of Bungalow Bill" at number 24 in his ranking of the White Album's 30 tracks. He agreed with Lennon's statement that the song is "a bit of fun" and that "despite arriving early on, "Bungalow Bill" lingers in the mind as a slice of tone-shifting oddness."

Personnel
John Lennon – lead vocal, acoustic guitar, Hammond organ, Mellotron
Paul McCartney – backing vocals, bass guitar
George Harrison – backing vocals, acoustic guitar
Ringo Starr – backing vocals, drums, tambourine
Chris Thomas – Mellotron
Yoko Ono – co-lead vocal, backing vocals
Maureen Starkey (and others) – backing vocals
Personnel per Ian MacDonald

Cover versions
When Mojo released The White Album Recovered in 2008, part of a continuing series of CDs of Beatles albums covered track-by-track by modern artists, the track was covered by Dawn Kinnard and Ron Sexsmith. Phish covered the song on the album Live Phish Volume 13 in 1994.

References

Bibliography

External links 
Web site of Richard A. Cooke III, who inspired this song
 

1968 songs
The Beatles songs
Songs written by Lennon–McCartney
Songs about fictional male characters
Song recordings produced by George Martin
Songs published by Northern Songs
The Beatles and India
British folk rock songs